Galagali  is a village in the southern state of Karnataka, India. It is located on the banks of river Krishna in the Bilgi taluk of Bagalkot district in Karnataka.

It is the birthplace of the Vedic scholar, poet, and orator Pandharinathacharya Galagali.

It is famous for Galagali Peda, a sweet dish.

Demographics
At the 2011 India census, Galagali had a population of 8380 with 4115 males and 4265 females.

See also
 Bagalkot
Bilagi

 Districts of Karnataka
 Galagali Multimedia
 Pandhareenathachar Galagali
 Krishna river
 Galagali Ramacharya

References

External links
 http://Bagalkot.nic.in/
 http://www.galagali.biz

Villages in Bagalkot district